Teleonomy is the quality of apparent purposefulness and of goal-directedness of structures and functions in living organisms brought about by natural processes like natural selection. The term derives from the Greek "τελεονομία", compound of two Greek words, τέλος, from τελε-, ("end", "goal", "purpose") and νόμος nomos ("law"). Teleonomy is sometimes contrasted with teleology, where the latter is understood as a purposeful goal-directedness brought about through human or divine intention. Teleonomy is thought to derive from evolutionary history, adaptation for reproductive success, and/or the operation of a program. Teleonomy is related to programmatic or computational aspects of purpose.

Relationship with teleology 

Colin Pittendrigh, who coined the term in 1958, applied it to biological phenomena that appear to be end-directed, hoping to limit the much older term teleology to actions planned by an agent who can internally model alternative futures with intention, purpose and foresight:

In 1965 Ernst Mayr cited Pittendrigh and criticized him for not making a "clear distinction between the two teleologies of Aristotle"; evolution involves Aristotle's material causes and formal causes rather than efficient causes. Mayr adopted Pittendrigh's term, but supplied his own definition:

Richard Dawkins described the properties of "archeo-purpose" (by natural selection) and "neo-purpose" (by evolved adaptation) in his talk on the "Purpose of Purpose". Dawkins attributes the brain's flexibility as an evolutionary feature in adapting or subverting goals to making neo-purpose goals on an overarching evolutionary archeo-purpose. Language allows groups to share neo-purposes, and cultural evolution - occurring much faster than natural evolution - can lead to conflict or collaborations.

In behavior analysis, Hayne Reese made the adverbial distinction between purposefulness (having an internal determination) and purposiveness (serving or effecting a useful function). Reese implies that non-teleological statements are called teleonomic when they represent an "if A then C" phenomenon's antecedent; where, teleology is a consequent representation. The concept of purpose, as only being the teleology final cause, requires supposedly impossible time reversal; because, the future consequent determines the present antecedent. Purpose, as being both in the beginning and the end, simply rejects teleology, and addresses the time reversal problem. In this, Reese sees no value for teleology and teleonomic concepts in behavior analysis; however, the concept of purpose preserved in process can be useful, if not reified. A theoretical time-dimensional tunneling and teleological functioning of temporal paradox would also fit this description without the necessity of a localized intelligence. Whereas the concept of a teleonomic process, such as evolution, can simply refer to a system capable of producing complex products without the benefit of a guiding foresight.

In 1966 George C. Williams approved of the term in the last chapter of his Adaptation and Natural Selection; a critique of some current evolutionary thought. In 1970, Jacques Monod, in Chance and Necessity, an Essay on the Natural Philosophy of Modern Biology, suggested teleonomy as a key feature that defines life:

In 1974 Ernst Mayr illustrated the difference in the statements:

 "The Wood Thrush migrates in the fall in order to escape the inclemency of the weather and the food shortages of the northern climates."

 "The Wood Thrush migrates in the fall and thereby escapes the inclemency of the weather and the food shortages of the northern climates."

Subsequently, philosophers like Ernest Nagel further analysed the concept of goal-directedness in biology and by 1982, philosopher and historian of science David Hull joked about the use of teleology and teleonomy by biologists:

Relationship to evolution

The concept of teleonomy was largely developed by Mayr and Pittendrigh to separate biological evolution from teleology. Pittendrigh's purpose was to enable biologists who had become overly cautious about goal-oriented language to have a way of discussing the goals and orientations of an organism's behaviors without inadvertently invoking teleology. Mayr was even more explicit, saying that while teleonomy certainly operates on the level of organisms, the process of evolution itself is necessarily non-teleonomic.

 This attitude towards the role of teleonomy in the evolutionary process is the consensus view of the modern synthesis.

Evolution largely hoards hindsight, as variations unwittingly make "predictions" about structures and functions which could successfully cope with the future, and which participate in a process of natural selection that culls the unfit, leaving the fit to the next generation. Information accumulates about functions and structures that are successful, exploiting feedback from the environment via the selection of fitter coalitions of structures and functions. Robert Rosen has described these features as an anticipatory system which builds an internal model based on past and possible future states.

In 1962, Grace A. de Laguna's "The Role of Teleonomy in Evolution" attempted to show how different stages of evolution were characterized by different types of teleonomy. de Laguna points out that humans have oriented teleonomy so that the teleonomic goal is not restricted to the reproduction of humans, but also to cultural ideals.

In recent years, a few biologists believe that the separation of teleonomy from the process of evolution has gone too far. Peter Corning notes that behavior, which is a teleonomic trait, is responsible for the construction of biological niches, which is an agent of selection. Therefore, it would be inaccurate to say that there was no role for teleonomy in the process of evolution, since teleonomy dictates the fitness landscape according to which organisms are selected.  Corning calls this phenomenon "teleonomic selection".

Philosophy
The Dutch Jewish philosopher Baruch Spinoza defined conatus as the tendency for individual things to persist in existence, meaning the pursuit of stability within the internal relations between their individual parts, in a similar way to homeostasis.
Spinoza also rejected the idea of finalism and asserted nature does not pursue specific goals and acts in a deterministic although non-directed way.

In teleology, Kant's positions as expressed in Critique of Judgment, were neglected for many years because in the minds of many scientists they were associated with vitalist views of evolution. Their recent rehabilitation is evident in teleonomy, which bears a number of features, such as the description of organisms, that are reminiscent of the Aristotelian conception of final causes as essentially recursive in nature. Kant's position is that, even though we cannot know whether there are final causes in nature, we are constrained by the peculiar nature of the human understanding to view organisms teleologically. Thus the Kantian view sees teleology as a necessary principle for the study of organisms, but only as a regulative principle, and with no ontological implications.

Talcott Parsons, in the later part of his working with a theory of social evolution and a related theory of world-history, adopted the concept of teleonomy as the fundamental organizing principle for directional processes and his theory of societal development in general. In this way, Parsons tried to find a theoretical compromise between voluntarism as a principle of action and the idea of a certain directionality in history.

Current status
Teleonomy is closely related to concepts of emergence, complexity theory, and self-organizing systems. It has extended beneath biology to be applied in the context of chemistry. Some philosophers of biology resist the term and still employ "teleology" when analyzing biological function and the language used to describe it, while others endorse it.

See also
Anthropic principle
Autopoiesis
Conatus
Naturalism (philosophy)
Orthogenesis
Religious naturalism
Theistic evolution
T-symmetry

References

Further reading
 Allen, C., M. Bekoff, G. Lauder, eds., Nature's Purposes: Analyses Of Function and Design in Biology. MIT Press, 1998.
 Mayr, Ernst, The Growth of Biological Thought. Diversity, Evolution, and Inheritance. Cambridge (MA): Belknap Press of Harvard University Press, 1982 : pp. 47–51 (differentiating four kinds of teleology).
 Mayr, Ernst, What Makes Biology Unique?: Considerations on the Autonomy of a Scientific Discipline, Cambridge University Press, 2004..
 Ruse, Michael Darwin and Design, Harvard University Press; 2004.

External links

 Merriam Webster definition
 Nonlinearity and Teleology
 Biological Information

Teleology
Evolution
Concepts in metaphysics